Francisco Sacco Landi (July 14, 1907 – June 7, 1989), better known as Chico, was a racing driver from São Paulo, Brazil.  He participated in six Formula One World Championship Grands Prix, debuting on September 16, 1951. He scored a total of 1.5 championship points, awarded for his fourth-place finish in the 1956 Argentine Grand Prix, a drive he shared with Gerino Gerini. He was the first Brazilian ever to take part in a Formula One Grand Prix, and also the first to score points.

History
Landi came from a modest middle-class family of Italian origins, and got into racing through his father, who owned a garage in Sào Paulo. Along with Manuel de Teffé and Irineu Corrêa, he popularized motor racing in Brazil in the late mid-thirties. Landi had left school at eleven to work as a mechanic, and later began illegal street racing at nights, where he had frequent run-ins with the police. In 1934 he made his racing debut, at the second Rio Grand Prix in 1934. He led until eight laps from the finish, when his engine gave out. He was the most popular Brazilian driver of his time, as many considered Teffé, who was the son of a diplomat of Prussian heritage, a wealthy expat rather than an actual Brazilian, as he had started his racing career while living in Europe. When Corrêa, who ended up winning the 1934 Rio Grand Prix, died in a crash on the first lap of next year, Landi was left as the undisputed master of pre-war racing in Brazil. Landi went abroad in 1938, finishing eighth at Bern in what is generally considered the first Brazilian Grand Prix entry. Landi's first Brazilian GP victory came at the 1941 Rio de Janeiro Grand Prix.

Landi was the first Brazilian driver to win a Grand Prix race, taking a Ferrari to victory at the Bari Grand Prix in 1948, run that year to Formula Two regulations. He also finished second in the 1952 (non-championship) Albi Grand Prix in a Ferrari 375.

Landi also won the 1960 Mil Milhas Brasil in an Alfa Romeo JK 2000, together with Christian "Bino" Heins. This was the first time that a Brazilian-made car won this prestigious race, rather than an American-based "Carretera" special.

Complete Formula One World Championship results
(key) 

† Indicates Shared Drive with Jan Flinterman
* Indicates Shared Drive with Gerino Gerini

References

External links 
 http://www.4mula1.ro/history/driver/Francisco_Landi
 http://www.grandprix.com/gpe/drv-lanfra.html

1907 births
1989 deaths
Brazilian racing drivers
Brazilian Formula One drivers
Scuderia Milano Formula One drivers
Maserati Formula One drivers
Brazilian people of Italian descent
World Sportscar Championship drivers